Leirsund Station is a railway station at Leirsund in Skedsmo, Norway on the Trunk Line. It is served by an hourly services, R13 by Vy. The station was opened in 1859, five years after the rest of Hovedbanen. When the Gardermoen Line was built in 1998 Leirsund was rebuilt and slightly moved.

External links
 

Railway stations on the Trunk Line
Railway stations in Skedsmo
Railway stations opened in 1859
1859 establishments in Norway